The 130th Engineer Battalion (130th EN BN) is a combat engineer battalion of the Puerto Rico Army National Guard allocated to the 101st Troop Command. The 130th is one of the most decorated battalions of the Puerto Rico National Guard with two Presidential Unit Citations, one Meritorious Unit Commendation, thirty five Purple Hearts, one Silver Star Medal, twenty six Bronze Star Medals, and four hundred and sixty nine Army Commendation Medals.

History 
Constituted 6 February 1959 in the Puerto Rico Army National Guard as the 126th Engineer Battalion.

Organized and Federally recognized 15 February 1959 from existing units with headquarters in Carolina, Puerto Rico.

Redesignated 1 May 1959 as the 130th Engineer Battalion.

Location of headquarters changed 31 December 1967 to Vega Baja.

Ordered into active Federal service 11 February 2003 at home stations; released from active Federal service 21 May 2003 and reverted to territorial control.

Ordered into active Federal service 23 July 2006 at home stations; released from active Federal service 18 January 2008 and reverted to territorial control. The 130th Eng. Bn. completed more than 1,500 combat patrol missions in Iraq, more than 44,000 miles of roads traveled and recon, 16,500 interrogations conducted, 7,300 hours expended in IED search throughout Baghdad and found and deactivated more than 280 IEDs.

Reorganized 1 September 2008 to consist of the headquarters and the Support Company (Companies A, B, C and D concurrently reorganized and redesignated as the 1013th Engineer Company, the 1014th Engineer Company, the 1011th Engineer Company, the 1010th Engineer Company and the 215th Fire Fighter Engineer Detachment, respectively hereafter separate lineages).

Structure 
 Executive branch of the government of Puerto Rico & National Guard Bureau & United States Department of the Army
 Puerto Rico National Guard & Army National Guard
 Puerto Rico Army National Guard
 101st Troop Command
 130th Engineer Battalion
 130th EN BN Headquarters and Headquarters Company (HHC)
 130th EN BN Forward Support Company (FSC)
 1010th Engineer Company
 1011th Engineer Company
 1013th Engineer (Sapper) Company
 1014th Engineer (Sapper) Company
 215th Fire Fighter Engineer Detachment

Honors and awards

Unit

Individuals

References 

Military units and formations in Puerto Rico
130
Puerto Rico Army National Guard